Azad Bakht-e Korreh Pa (also Romanized as Āzād Bakht-e Korreh Pā; also known as Āzād Bakht-e Korreh Pā-ye Owlīyā, Bābā Qolī-ye Āzādbakht, Āzād Bakht, and Bābā Qolī) is a village in Kuhdasht-e Jonubi Rural District, in the Central District of Kuhdasht County, Lorestan Province, Iran. At the 2006 census, its population was 422, in 87 families.

References 

Towns and villages in Kuhdasht County